Porcellio albicornis is a species of woodlouse in the family Porcellionidae. It is found in Italy, including the island of Sicily from where it was first described.

References

Porcellionidae
Woodlice of Europe
Endemic arthropods of Italy
Crustaceans described in 1896